Thornton is a rural locality in the Lockyer Valley Region, Queensland, Australia.

Geography 
Thornton is a mountainous area. It is bounded to the west by the ridge of the Mistake Mountains range and to the east by the ridge of the Little Liverpool Range.  Laidley Creek passes through the valley from south to north between the two mountain ranges.

Mount Zahel is in the south-west of the locality near the Mistake Mountains. Mount Cooper is in the north of the location. Laidley Gap is a pass through the Mistake Mountains. The name is derived from Laidley Plain, which was named on 22 June 1829 after James Laidley by explorer Allan Cunningham.

Mount Beau Brummell is in the east of the locality within the Little Liverpool Range. Edwards Gap is a pass through the Little Liverpool Range

History 
Thornton Provisional School opened on 11 October 1881 by its first principal W.J. Mitchell. It became Thornton State School on 1 April 1890.

Thornton Primitive Methodist Church opened on 24 May 1885. In October 1952 memorial gates were dedicated to Joseph Cook who died on active service, a tribute from his mother Mrs Eliza Cook and the church trustees.  

St George's Anglican Church was dedicated on Thursday 8 February 1906 by Archdeacon Arthur Rivers. The church was an ornate wooden building, . Its closure on 3 May 2005 was approved by Assistant Bishop Rob Nolan.

Education 
Thornton State School is a government co-educational primary school (P-6) at 4 Thornton School Road. In 2016, the school had an enrolment of 22 students with 3 teachers (2 full-time equivalent) and 5 non-teaching staff (2 full-time equivalent).

There is no secondary school in Thornton. The nearest secondary school is Laidley State High School in Laidley.

References

Further reading

External links 

Lockyer Valley Region
Localities in Queensland